Arhopala dajagaka is a butterfly in the family Lycaenidae. It was described by George Thomas Bethune-Baker in 1896. It is endemic to Borneo.

References

External links
Arhopala Boisduval, 1832 at Markku Savela's Lepidoptera and Some Other Life Forms

Arhopala
Butterflies described in 1896
Butterflies of Borneo
Taxa named by George Thomas Bethune-Baker